Cyborg Superman is a persona that has been used by two supervillains who appear in comic books published by DC Comics.

Fictional character biographies

Hank Henshaw

Hank Henshaw is an astronaut at NASA until a solar flare hits his space shuttle during an experiment in space, damaging the ship and the crew. Henshaw and the crew, including Henshaw's wife, found that their bodies had begun to mutate and, after returning to Earth, Henshaw's entire crew either perished or eventually committed suicide. After learning that Superman had thrown the Eradicator into the sun in a battle during the space shuttle experiment, Henshaw blames Superman for the solar flare and the accident. Before his body completely disintegrated due to the radiation exposure, Henshaw is able to save his consciousness. Using NASA communications equipment, Henshaw beamed his mind into the birthing matrix which had carried Superman from Krypton to Earth as an infant. He creates a small exploration craft from the birthing matrix and departs into outer space alone. Becoming increasingly mentally unstable, Henshaw uses Superman's birthing matrix to create a body identical to Superman's, albeit with cybernetic parts. He returns to Earth to kill Superman, only to discover that Superman had already died during Henshaw's absence. Following Superman's eventual resurrection, Henshaw would not only become a recurring adversary of Superman but of Green Lantern as well. He later becomes a member of the Sinestro Corps during the Sinestro Corps War.

Zor-El

Zor-El is the younger brother of Jor-El, husband of Alura, father of Supergirl, and paternal uncle of Superman. Originally, he escaped from Krypton's destruction along with the other inhabitants of Argo City. In The New 52 reboot of DC's continuity, Supergirl discovers an amnesiac Cyborg Superman living on the planet I'noxia. This turns out to be Zor-El, who was rescued from Krypton's destruction by Brainiac and reconfigured as a half-man half-machine in order to be his scout looking for stronger species in the universe.

Powers and abilities

Hank Henshaw
As Cyborg Superman, Hank Henshaw possesses the ability to control and reanimate various machines. From his experience with Superman's birth matrix, Henshaw now has powers and genetic tissue all identical to the Man of Steel. As the Sinestro Corps member, he has access to a power ring fueled by fear that allows him to create any construct at will.

Zor-El
As Cyborg Superman, Zor-El is bionically enhanced with the ability to fly, fire powerful laser eyebeams, and project electricity from his body. His cybernetic arm can shapeshift into whatever he desires, limited only by the technology available to him at any given moment. He is virtually indestructible, as well as being super strong and fast.

In other media

Television
David Harewood portrays Hank Henshaw in the 2015 Supergirl TV series. When discussing his character, Harewood said that "Hank Henshaw ends up becoming Cyborg Superman in the comics, battling Superman. So I'm looking forward to that. He's a bit of a supervillain. He seems pretty indestructible. Which I kind of like because I keep getting blown up in these things. I'm kind of looking forward to being indestructible". Cyborg Superman debuted in the episode "The Darkest Place".

Film
Hank Henshaw appears in the 2018 film The Death of Superman and its 2019 sequel Reign of the Supermen, voiced by Patrick Fabian as himself and Jerry O'Connell as Cyborg Superman. His story plays out like in the comics with the exception that his shuttle's destruction was caused by the meteor holding Doomsday with his crew killed instantly, his body being salvaged by Darkseid for his plan to tarnish the Justice League's reputation and execute another invasion.

Video games
 Cyborg Superman is a playable character as one of the Supermen included in the SNES & Genesis video game The Death and Return of Superman in 1994. He is also the final boss of the game.
 Hank Henshaw appears as a boss character in 2002's Superman: The Man of Steel.
 Cyborg Superman appears in Injustice: Gods Among Us, as a downloadable alternate skin for Superman.
 Hank Henshaw also appears in DC Universe Online in the ninth DLC, "War of the Light Part I". As a Hero, the players fight him and Sinestro in "Assault & Battery", and again as a boss in "Mist Recovery". As a Villain, he assists the players in collecting Mist and fighting Kyle Rayner in "Mist Recovery".
 Cyborg Superman appears as a playable character in Lego Batman 3: Beyond Gotham, voiced by Travis Willingham.

Radio
British wunderkind radio producer Dirk Maggs produced a Superman radio series for BBC Radio 5 in the 1990s. When the "Death of Superman" story arc happened in the comics, Maggs presented a very faithful, though much pared down, version of the tale which featured Stuart Milligan as Clark Kent/Superman, Lorelei King as Lois Lane, and William Hootkins as Lex Luthor. Versatile American actor Kerry Shale was cast both as the villainous Hank Henshaw and as Superboy. The story arc was packaged for sale on cassette and CD as Superman: Doomsday and Beyond in the UK and as Superman Lives! in the USA.

Miscellaneous
 In Superman/Fantastic Four: The Infinite Destruction, a comic book crossover starring Superman and the Fantastic Four, Reed Richards and his team are forced into an uneasy alliance with Hank Henshaw when the Marvel Universe's world-eating being Galactus kidnaps Superman and transforms him into his herald. In conversation with Susan Richards, Henshaw points out the "ironic" similarity between his origin and the FF's. The story concludes with Galactus blasting Henshaw with a ray that turns him into a simple metal rod in response to his pleas for perfection, after the discovery that Henshaw was responsible for Superman coming to the Marvel Universe after he planted faked evidence that Galactus was involved in Krypton's destruction (having previously encountered the Silver Surfer in Green Lantern/Silver Surfer: Unholy Alliances, Henshaw had learned of Galactus and sought the enhanced power of becoming his herald).
 Hank Henshaw appeared in issue #19 of the Batman: The Brave and the Bold comics. Batman had to work with the Green Lantern Corps to keep Hank Henshaw from killing Hal Jordan.

See also
 List of Green Lantern enemies
 List of Superman enemies

References

Cyborg supervillains
DC Comics cyborgs
DC Comics male supervillains
DC Comics aliens
DC Comics characters with superhuman strength
DC Comics hybrids
Fictional extraterrestrial–human hybrids in comics
Kryptonians
Superman characters